Mystic Voyage is a studio album by Roy Ayers Ubiquity. It was released in 1975 through Polydor Records. Recording sessions for the album took place at Kaye-Smith/Van Ackeren Studios in Seattle, Washington and at Electric Lady Studios in New York City. This album is dedicated to the memory of Julian "Cannonball" Adderley.

The album peaked at number 90 on the Billboard Top LPs chart and number 13 on the R&B albums chart in the United States. Its lead single, "Mystic Voyage", reached No. 70 on the R&B singles chart.

Track listing

Personnel 
Roy Ayers Ubiquity 
 Roy Ayers – lead vocals, vibraphone, electric piano, clavinet, percussion, ARP synthesizer, arrangement (tracks: 1, 2, 4–10), producer
 Debby "Chicas" Darby – lead vocals, backing vocals
 Edwin L. Birdsong – vocals
 Calvin Brown – vocals, guitar, arrangement (track 3)
 Byron Lee Miller – bass, backing vocals
 Richard David Lawson – drums
 Chano O'Ferral – bongos, congas
 Willie Michael – percussion
 Joe Brazil – soprano saxophone
 Onzy Durrett Matthews, Jr. – arrangement
Technical 
 Ron Gangnes – recording
 Ralph Moss – engineering
 Buzz Richmond – engineering
 Neal Teeman – assistant engineering
 Sheri Leverich – art direction
 David Rawcliffe – photography
 Joel Brodsky – photography
 Robert Hickson – illustration

Chart history

References

External links 

1975 albums
Jazz-funk albums
Roy Ayers albums
Polydor Records albums
Albums produced by Roy Ayers